Hits Magic & Rock 'N Roll is a studio album of cover music and eighth studio album overall by Australian pop singer John Farnham (known then as Johnny Farnham). The album was released in June 1973.
Singles include Brian Cadd's "Don't You Know it's Magic".

Track listing
Side A
 "Everything Is Out of Season"	
 Nobody's Fool	
 "It's Up to You"	
 "If You Would Stay"	
 "Sweet Cherry Wine"	
 "Don't You Know It's Magic"

Side B	
 "Rock Me Baby"	
 "Lucille"
 "Blueberry Hill
 "Johnny B Goode"	
 "Diana"
 "Memphis Tennessee

References

1973 albums
John Farnham albums